Baida may refer to:

People
Peter Baida (1950-1999) American short story writer
Dmytro Vyshnevetsky, hetman of the Ukrainian Cossacks, known as Baida in Ukrainian folk songs

Music
Baïda (album), 1997, by Faudel
Baida (Ralph Alessi album), 2012

See also
 Bayda (disambiguation), and variants
 Ramlet al-Baida, a public beach in Beirut, Lebanon